The 1994 Chicago Bears season was their 75th regular season completed in the National Football League (NFL). The Bears matched their 9–7 record under head coach Dave Wannstedt for their first winning season since the end of the 1991 season. The club was one of four teams from the NFC Central to make the playoffs. This was also the NFL's 75th Anniversary so the Bears wore 1920s-era throwback jerseys in a few games.  The Bears celebrated their first playoff win since January 6, 1991, with a hard-fought road victory over the NFC Central champion Minnesota Vikings 35–18 before being knocked out by the eventual Super Bowl champion San Francisco 49ers 44–15 at Candlestick Park.

1994 was the last time the Bears made the playoffs during the 1990s as the following seasons would be disastrous. They would not return to postseason contention until 2001.

Offseason

NFL draft

Undrafted free agents

Staff

Roster

Regular season

Schedule

Standings

Playoffs

References

External links

 1994 Chicago Bears at Pro-Football-Reference.com

Chicago Bears
Chicago Bears seasons
Bear
1990s in Chicago
1994 in Illinois